The Cricovul Dulce or Cricov is a left tributary of the river Ialomița in Romania. It discharges into the Ialomița near Podu Văleni. It flows through the towns and villages Valea Lungă-Cricov, Iedera de Jos, Moreni, Ion Luca Caragiale, Vlădeni, Băltița, Hăbud, and Crivățu. Part of the water from the river Prahova is diverted towards the Cricovul Dulce by the canal Iazul Morilor Prahova.

Tributaries
The following rivers are tributaries to the river Cricovul Dulce (from source to mouth):

Left: Sultan, Valea Ursului, Ruda, Provița
Right: Strâmbul, Neagra

References

Rivers of Romania
Rivers of Prahova County
Rivers of Dâmbovița County